John Gallagher may refer to:

Sportspeople
John Gallagher (athlete) (1890–?), American long-distance runner
John Gallagher (baseball) (1892–1952), Major League Baseball player
John Gallagher (basketball) (born 1977), head men's basketball coach at the University of Hartford
John Gallagher (golfer) (born 1981), Scottish professional golfer
John Gallagher (ice hockey) (1909–1981), professional ice hockey player
John Gallagher (rugby) (born 1964), British-born New Zealand rugby union, and rugby league player
John Gallagher (rugby league), rugby league player for Batley
John Bán Gallagher, Gaelic footballer for Donegal
John J. Gallagher (coach) (1904–1982), American college football and basketball player and coach

Politicians
John E. Gallagher (politician), American politician
John P. Gallagher (1932–2011), American politician in the New Jersey Senate
John J. Gallagher (politician) (born 1944), American politician in the New Jersey General Assembly
John S. Gallagher (1849–1920), Ontario merchant and political figure

Others
John Gallagher (barrister), member of the board of the Australian Broadcasting Corporation
John Gallagher (bishop) (1846–1923), Irish-born bishop of the Australian Roman Catholic Archdiocese of Canberra and Goulburn
John Gallagher (cartoonist), American cartoonist
John Gallagher (geologist) (1916–1998), Canadian geologist and businessman
John Andrew Gallagher (1919–1980), British historian
John Gallagher Jr. (born 1984), American actor and musician
John Gallagher III (born 1947), American astronomer
John E. Gallagher (1958–2019), American television director
John M. Gallagher (born 1966), United States district judge
John Gallagher, guitarist/vocalist for the American death metal band Dying Fetus
John Gallagher, bassist/vocalist for the English heavy metal band Raven
John Gallagher (fl. 1830s), American naval commander, in command of USS Vandalia

See also
Gallagher (surname)
Jon Gallagher (born 1996), Irish footballer
Jack Gallagher (disambiguation)
Jackie Gallagher (disambiguation)
John Gallacher (disambiguation)